SYC may refer to:

 The Squantum Yacht Club in Quincy, Massachusetts
 The Republic of Seychelles archipelago nation in the Indian Ocean
 The ISO 639-3 code for the Syriac language